Homesick for Germany is a 1954 West German adventure film directed by Bernhard Radetzki and starring Albert Lieven, Ingrid Lutz, and Petra Peters. It is also known as Adventure in Lebanon (.

It was shot in Eastmancolor.

Cast

References

Bibliography

External links 
 

1954 films
West German films
German drama films
1954 drama films
1950s German-language films
Films set in Lebanon
1950s German films